Holy Trinity Church-Episcopal is a historic Gothic Revival stone church at North Cedar and East Luverne Streets in Luverne, Minnesota, United States.

Its first rector, the Rev. C.S. Ware, and Bishop Mahlon Norris Gilbert set its cornerstone on August 19, 1891. The church was completed late that same year, costing $6,000. It was built with Sioux Quartzite from a local quarry.

The building was added to the National Register of Historic Places in 1980. It was an active parish of the Episcopal Church in Minnesota until 2016, when the church closed its doors and was offered for sale.

References

Buildings and structures in Rock County, Minnesota
Episcopal church buildings in Minnesota
Churches on the National Register of Historic Places in Minnesota
Churches completed in 1891
19th-century Episcopal church buildings
National Register of Historic Places in Rock County, Minnesota